"The Gift Outright" is a poem written by Robert Frost. Frost originally recited it at the College of William & Mary in 1941, but its most famous recitation occurred at the inauguration of John F. Kennedy in 1961.

Publication
The poem was first published in the Virginia Quarterly Review in Spring of 1942. It was collected in Frost's volume A Witness Tree  in 1943. According to Jeffrey S. Cramer the poem may have been written as early as 1936. Frost was a big lover of his country, and wrote many poems about American life, culture, beliefs, etc. "His poem, ‘The Gift Outright', reveals his patriotic fervor and presents the history of his country since the days of colonialism." Frost meant this poem to be a symbol of patriotism in hard times. Surrounding current events in the world may have contributed to the creation of the poem, such as World War II and the Great Depression.The poem may have been written as a tribute to the country's worth and the hopefully growing economy.

Interpretation and Reception
Interpretations of “The Gift Outright” have changed drastically throughout the 20th and 21st centuries. The poem was recited at John F. Kennedy's inauguration, and was met with cheering and applause. Some critics would later form a very different view than that of the onlooking crowds.

Positive Reception
Several readers of Robert Frost’s work applaud him for his patriotism. Philip Booth, an American poet, highlights the patriotic nature of Frost’s work. Booth states “we became a free nation not in surrender to a parent-state, but by giving ourselves outright to the revolutionary impulse,” making reference to America gaining independence from Britain.

Criticism 
Described as a “history of the United States” by Robert Frost himself, the poem states that Americans and their kinship are of belonging to the American lands, insinuating that native peoples did not already inhabit substantial amounts of land. Siobhan Philips directly criticizes this aspect of the poem, mentioning “the poem’s racist assumption of a white, European, landowning “we” and its racist ignorance of how the same Europeans worked to eradicate Native American culture and perpetuate slavery.” Lionel Trilling’s criticism of the poet was perceived to be an attack not only on the values of the poet but on the American myth overall. Nowadays, the majority of critics agree with him. The so-called “terrifying poet” originally wrote “The Gift Outright” to inspire Americans as they overcame the Great Depression. Hence, the poem had a different message and motivation in the past. This is also the case because the Pearl Harbor attacks occurred just two days after the poem was read at the inauguration. This may have inspired Americans to extract a different message from the poem than what was originally intended by Frost. This poem, thus, is linked with patriotism.

Interpretation 
Within the first lines of the poem, multiple critics have connected the poem to the Frontier myth. Frost is “provoking readers’ thought” by using words to create the idea that before North America was populated by Europeans, the land was uninhabited and uncivilized. Hamida Bosmajian believes that the entirety of the poem “can be seen as a joke at the expense of negligible folk”, implying that uneducated people are unable to understand what the poet is saying. Furthermore, she interprets the poem as a way to describe how America tries to reconcile its past, while on the other hand not fully understanding itself at the present. She also identifies that the further on the reader delves into the poem, the more ambiguous the lines seem. When Frost uses the word "unenhanced", this hints at the idea that the final lines should deliver the idea that while America in the past was unrefined, the future may also bring forth an indefinite present. Furthermore, Frost weaves in criticisms within the second half of the poem. For example, the line "(The deed of many gifts was many deeds of war)" contradicts the word "surrender" in the line above. It is up to the reader to whether or not the include the parenthetical line, but whether they do so will also determine the meaning of the poem. This contributes to its ambiguity. When these details are overlooked, the reader may become wrapped up in the aura of the poem, which relays a nationalistic vibe.

Inaugural Recitation
“The Gift Outright” was not originally intended to be read by itself at Kennedy’s inauguration. The poem titled “For John F. Kennedy’s Inauguration” was a poem meant to lead up to “The Gift Outright” to encourage nationalism within the crowd during the new beginnings of the Kennedy Administration. During the ceremony, Frost was unable to read his own work because of the sun’s reflection on the paper making the words illegible, so he recited “The Gift Outright” which he had written and published years earlier by memory. Kennedy later stated that Frost’s work was “the deepest source of our national strength”. “The Gift Outright”, an evidently patriotic piece, had the last line of the original poem, “such as she will become”, altered by the request of Kennedy in order to demonstrate how the Kennedy administration will uplift America and make it better. During his reading Frost says “Such as she would become, has become, and I– and for this occasion let me change that to– what she will become”. “The Gift Outright” tells a story about how Europeans came to what would become The Americas, an “unstoried, artless, [and] unenhanced” land, and supposedly turned it into something more enhanced and full of history. Frost emphasizes what Kennedy will do to the United States by including all three variations of the last line of the poem, and saying that whatever America became in the past, Kennedy will continue to make improvements.

Critical Responses
Many critics have acknowledged Robert Frost’s lack of representation and level of deviation in his poem “The Gift Outright”. According to Robert F. Fleissner, the author of “Frost and Racism: The Evidence”, Frost explains his strong feelings towards puritan equality and the Jeffersonian “ideal” of equality in his poems. He refers to America as ‘our’ land throughout the poem and also uses the terms ‘England’s’ and ‘we’ to describe Americans in history. This disregards the previous native population that inhabited America long before and makes their history seem insignificant. Due to this way of thinking, Frost has been accused of perpetuating the ‘American Myth’. This myth is the idea that Americans can reiterate lies about history and leave out parts of the story to make it seem like the Europeans were on the right side of history in America. For example, here Native Americans are an absent presence within his poem and completely leaves them out of a crucial part in American history. Critics including Tyler Hoffman go as far to say that Frost creates a superiority complex within this poem with his writing style and voice comparing that to the native voice. The Washington Post does a great job of encompassing “The Gift Outright” by calling it a ‘Eurocentric colonialist message’ that in this day and age would’ve been heavily criticized if recited now. Even though this poem completely disregards native Americans and the stealing of their land, this way of thinking was tolerated at the time it was written by many Americans. Not until years later did critics start to realize and speak about his ignorance and negligence towards Native American lives in this poem.

Another critic’s view of Frost’s 1941 writing provides an interesting look on the poem. The author, Hamida Bosmajian, felt that “The Gift Outright” was focused around ideas of manifest destiny and the worries that come with that. Bosmanjian states, “The whole poem can be seen as a joke at the expense of negligible folk, namely all those who are immune to the subtleties of the poet's art.” The negligible folks referred to are the same people devastated by the consequences of manifest destiny and the author felt like Frost was naïve to their struggle. The author later criticize how Frost’s verbiage in the final lines implied that the Native Americans had no society, stories, and history with it. She states that “Frost is, of course, playing with the reader of his commentary and of his poem, for the final lines mean not only that the land was unstoried, artless, unenhanced, but would become so too.” Maya Angelou agrees with Bosmajian’s critique of the poems lack of accountability. Angelou states, “its praise of the land moving “westward” pays no heed to the African-American and Native Americans.”

One critique of Frost’s “The Gift Outright” comes in the form of another poem, “The Theft Outright” by Heid Erdrich, which directly parallels and rebuts Frost’s poem in many ways. The poem opens with the lines, “We were the land's before we were. // Or the land was ours before you were a land. / Or this land was our land, it was not your land. // We were the land before we were people” (Erdrich 1–4), contrasting and paralleling Frost’s opening of “The land was ours before we were the land’s. / She was our land more than a hundred years / Before we were her people” (Frost 1–3). Erdrich uses these lines to illustrate that there were people living in North America long before any English Colonists came over, contrary to the narrative Frost pushes in his opening lines. Erdrich continues throughout the poem to discuss the history of Native Americans, often overlooked by people like Frost, mentioning different creation myths as well as the Bering Strait Land Bridge. Erdrich also discusses different aspects of Native American culture, emphasizing the idea that Native Americans are “still storied, art-filled, fully enhanced” (Erdrich 30), once again directly contradicting a line from Frost which describes North America as being “unstoried artless, unenhanced” (Frost 15) before English Colonists arrived. Erdrich's poem directly critiques Frost’s and does so by bringing to light the culture and art of the Native Americans that Frost pushed to the side.

See also

Poems at United States presidential inaugurations

References

External links
'The Gift Outright' at the JFK Presidential Library

1942 poems
Poetry by Robert Frost
Inaugural poems
American poems